Richard Eoin Roche (born 30 March 1947) is an Irish former Fianna Fáil politician who served as Minister of State for European Affairs from 2002 to 2004 and 2007 to 2011 and Minister for the Environment, Heritage and Local Government from 2004 to 2007. He served as a Teachta Dála (TD) for the Wicklow constituency from 1987 to 1992 and 1997 to 2011. He was a Senator for the Administrative Panel from 1992 to 1997.

Early and private life
Roche was born in Wexford. He was educated at Wexford Christian Brothers School and University College Dublin (UCD) where he received Bachelor of Commerce Degree and a master's degree in Public Administration.

Roche is married to Eleanor Griffin, and they have three sons and one daughter. They live in County Wicklow.

On 15 December 2008, he was held hostage during a robbery at the Druids Glen Marriott Hotel and Country Club in County Wicklow.

Political career
Roche worked as a public servant at the Departments of Posts and Telegraphs, Transport and Power, Finance and at the Department of Economic Planning and Development. In 1978, he was appointed lecturer in Public Administration and Public Finance at UCD. In 1978, Roche became the first Irish Citizen to be awarded a United Nations Human Rights fellowship. He subsequently became a member of the Irish Commission for Justice and Peace and served as a time as Chairman of the commission.

Roche began his political career in 1985, when he was elected to Wicklow County Council. Two years later, at the 1987 general election he was elected to Dáil Éireann as a Fianna Fáil TD for the Wicklow constituency.

Roche lost his seat at the 1992 general election, but was elected to Seanad Éireann. In the Irish Senate Roche introduced a Freedom of Information Bill-based closely on the Norwegian Freedom of Information legislation. He was returned to the 28th Dáil at the 1997 general election and remained a TD until 2011.

Following the 2002 general election Roche was appointed Minister of State at the Department of the Taoiseach and the Department of Foreign Affairs with special responsibility for European Affairs. In his role, effectively as Minister for Europe, he played a large role during Ireland's Presidency of the European Council in 2004. In 2004, Roche was conferred with the Order of the Cross of Terra Mariana by the Government of Estonia for his support of Estonia's accession to the European Union. In 2004, he became Minister for the Environment, Heritage and Local Government. He retained his seat at the 2007 general election, but on the formation of the new government, was the only member of the previous Cabinet to be demoted, being re-appointed as Minister of State for European Affairs.

His last act as Minister for the Environment, Heritage and Local Government was the signing of an order that was to lead to work being resumed on the controversial M3 motorway near the Hill of Tara. He remained Minister of State for European Affairs, during which Ireland conducted two referendums on the Treaty of Lisbon.

2011 election defeat
He lost his seat at the 2011 general election, polling only 5.5% of the vote which was down from the 15.8% he polled four years previously. Roche prolonged the count by requesting a recount when it was found that only three votes separated him and his Fianna Fáil running mate Pat Fitzgerald, an action which was criticised by some other candidates including Fitzgerald, who also accepted that there wouldn't be a seat for Fianna Fáil. He was not present at the announcement of his elimination which was greeted by cheering and applause from a number of people at the count centre.

References

 

1947 births
Living people
Alumni of University College Dublin
Fianna Fáil TDs
Local councillors in County Wicklow
Members of the 25th Dáil
Members of the 26th Dáil
Members of the 19th Seanad
Members of the 20th Seanad
Members of the 28th Dáil
Members of the 29th Dáil
Members of the 30th Dáil
Ministers for the Environment (Ireland)
Ministers of State of the 28th Dáil
Ministers of State of the 29th Dáil
Ministers of State of the 30th Dáil
Politicians from County Wexford
Recipients of the Order of the Cross of Terra Mariana, 1st Class
Nominated members of Seanad Éireann
Fianna Fáil senators